Refuge Crête Sèche or Rifugio Crête Sèche is a shelter in the Alps of Italy near the border with Switzerland. It lies on the slopes of Mont de Crête Sèche whose summit is at elevation .

The shelter was built in 1982, and is owned by the Italian Alpine Club. This same mountain pass continues from Italy into the Swiss district of Entremont in the canton of Valais. Another mountain near this shelter is Bec d'Epicoune, elevation .

To reach the shelter, one can hike on a dirt trail for about two hours from the village of Rû in the municipality of Bionaz.  The capacity of this shelter in summer is 86 beds, and in winter 8 beds.

External links
Topographic map 1
Topographic map 2 (showing "Ref. Crête Sèche" on map).

References

Mountain huts in the Alps
Mountain huts in Aosta Valley